Dynactin subunit 4 is a protein that in humans is encoded by the DCTN4 gene.

References

Further reading